Milltown is an unincorporated community in Missoula County, Montana, United States. The community has a post office, with ZIP code 59851.

Originally named Riverside, Milltown began with the nearby mill in 1886. Unlike neighboring Bonner, which was the company town with company store and housing for mill managers and supervisors, Milltown formed organically a half mile up the river for mill workers and other support businesses.

References

External links
 Milltown Oral History Project (University of Montana Archives)

Unincorporated communities in Missoula County, Montana
Unincorporated communities in Montana